Maya Ajmera is the President and CEO of Society for Science and Executive Publisher of Science News.

Ajmera is the founder of The Global Fund for Children, a nonprofit organization that invests philanthropic capital in innovative community-based organizations working with some of the world's most vulnerable children and youth.

She is the author of the 2016 book Invisible Children: Reimagining International Development at the Grassroots with Gregory A. Fields, published by Palgrave Macmillan.  Ajmera is also the author of over twenty children's books, including Children from Australia to Zimbabwe: A Photographic Journey Around the World, Extraordinary Girls, To Be an Artist, Faith, and Healthy Kids.

Biography

Early life and education
Raised in eastern North Carolina by Indian immigrants, Ajmera graduated from the North Carolina School of Science and Mathematics in Durham. She holds a bachelor's degree in biology from Bryn Mawr College and a master's degree in public policy from the Sanford School of Public Policy at Duke University.

Career
Ajmera founded The Global Fund for Children in 1994, when she was 25 years old.  The inspiration came from a trip she took to India on a Rotary Fellowship a few years earlier. While waiting for a train she saw a group of children being taught by a teacher on a train platform. Ajmera learned that these children were students in a Train Platform School for impoverished children who could not attend school. Moved by what she saw, instead of attending medical school Ajmera started classes at Duke University's Sanford School of Public Policy; with facilities provided by Duke and professor William Ascher she applied for and won a seed grant from Echoing Green.  This initial funding helped her build an organization to support innovative grassroots efforts on behalf of vulnerable children around the world.

During her tenure years with the organization, the Global Fund for Children gave nearly $25 million in capital to nearly 500 grassroots organizations in 75 countries.  These grants have served more than seven million children around the world.  Ajmera left her position as president in 2011, after eighteen years, and remained on GFC's board of directors until 2013.

Since 2011, Ajmera is a professorial lecturer at the Paul H. Nitze School of Advanced International Studies at Johns Hopkins University, and served as a visiting scholar from 2011 to 2013.

For the 2013–2014 school year, Ajmera served as the inaugural Social Entrepreneur in Residence for Duke University and a visiting professor of the Practice of Public Policy at the Sanford School of Public Policy at Duke.

As of August 2014, Ajmera is the president and CEO of the Society for Science and publisher of Science News. 
The Society is known for its world class science competitions, including the Broadcom MASTERS, the Regeneron Science Talent Search, and the Regeneron International Science and Engineering Fair. She was a member of the Honors Group of the Westinghouse Science Talent Search, now sponsored by Regeneron.

Maya serves on the boards of directors of New Global Citizens and Kids in Need of Defense, and is the co-chair of the board of Echoing Green.

Ajmera is a trustee for the North Carolina School of Science and Math and is on the Board of Visitors of the Sanford School of Public Policy at Duke University.  She also serves on numerous advisory boards, including the Center for Advanced Social Entrepreneurship (CASE) at Duke University, the American India Foundation, the Golden Baobob Prize, and  Africans in the Diaspora (AiD).

She was a trustee for the Blue Moon fund, and she served on the board of the Washington Area Women's Foundation for nine years before becoming part of that organization's Leadership Council.

Marriage and children
Maya Ajmera is married to David Hutzler Hollander Jr., a partner at Adduci, Mastriani & Schaumberg.  They have one daughter.

Honors and awards 
Ajmera was the recipient of a Rotary International Graduate Fellowship to study in South Asia in 1989–1990. She was also the recipient of the 1993-1997 Echoing Green Public Service Graduate Fellowship and the William C. Friday Fellowship for Human Relations of North Carolina.

In October 2007, Maya Ajmera was featured on CNN's Heroes segment. Actress Mira Sorvino named Ajmera as her hero.

In June 2008, Maya Ajmera received the Women of Distinction award at the 2008 National Conference for College Women Student Leaders at Georgetown University. The award is given to women who have made amazing accomplishments in their professions and who serve as inspiring role models for female students.
 
She served on the Innovation and Civil Society subgroup of the Obama Presidential Transition's Technology, Innovation, and Government Reform Policy Working Group.

Ajmera was a member of the 2011 class of Henry Crown Fellows at the Aspen Institute.

In May 2014, she received the Rotary International's Global Alumni Service to Humanity Award, presented at the Rotary Global Convention in Sydney, Australia.

Published works
Invisible Children: Reimagining International Development at the Grassroots by Maya Ajmera with Gregory A. Fields. Palgrave Macmillan 2016.

Published children's works
Xanadu: The Imaginary Place   Edited by Maya Ajmera and Olateju Omolodun. Charlesbridge 1999.
Extraordinary Girl   By Maya Ajmera, Olateju Omolodun, and Sarah Strunk. Charlesbridge 1999.
Let the Games Begin!   By Maya Ajmera and Michael J. Regan. Charlesbridge 2000.
Children from Australia to Zimbabwe   By Maya Ajmera and Anna Rhesa Versola. Charlesbridge 2001.
Come Out and Play   By Maya Ajmera and John D. Ivanko. Charlesbridge 2001.
To Be a Kid   By Maya Ajmera and John D. Ivanko. Charlesbridge 2001.
Back to School   By Maya Ajmera and John D. Ivanko. Charlesbridge 2001.
A Kid's Best Friend   By Maya Ajmera and Alex Fisher. Charlesbridge 2002.
Animal Friends   By Maya Ajmera and John D. Ivanko. Charlesbridge 2002.
To Be an Artist   By Maya Ajmera and John D. Ivanko. Charlesbridge 2004.
Be My Neighbor   By Maya Ajmera and John D. Ivanko. Charlesbridge 2004.
Children of the USA  By Maya Ajmera, Arlene Hirschfelder, Yvonne Wakim Dennis, and Cynthia Pon. Charlesbridge 2008.
 Faith By Maya Ajmera, Magda Nakassis and Cynthia Pon. Charlesbridge 2009.
Our Grandparents: A Global Album By Maya Ajmera, Sheila Kinkade and Cynthia Pon. Charlesbridge, 2010.
What We Wear: Dressing Up Around the World By Maya Ajmera, Elise Dertine, and Cynthia Pon. Charlesbridge 2012.
Global Baby Girls By Maya Ajmera. Charlesbridge 2013.
Healthy Kids By Maya Ajmera, Victoria Dunning and Cynthia Pon. Charlesbridge 2013.
Music Everywhere! By Maya Ajmera, Elise Hoter Derstine and Cynthia Pon. Charlesbridge 2014.
Global Baby Boys By Maya Ajmera. Charlesbridge 2014.
Global Baby Bedtimes By Maya Ajmera. Charlesbridge 2015.
Every Breath We Take By Maya Ajmera and Dominique Browning. Charlesbridge 2016.

Many of Maya's books have forewords written by prominent individuals, including Archbishop Desmond Tutu, Melinda French Gates, Julianne Moore, Bill Bradley, Marian Wright Edelman, John Hope Franklin, and even Kermit the Frog.

Interviews and speeches 

Interview with the Clinton Global Initiative, 2007

Interview with Think Change India, 2008 

Appearance on NPR's Tell Me More, 2008

Interview with The Financial Times, 2008

Appearance on Dallas NPR Station KERA, 2009

TEDxAshokaU: Universities Driving Global Change at Duke University, February 25, 2011

TEDxSMU, 2011

William D. Reimert Lecture, Cedar Crest College, 2011.

References

Year of birth missing (living people)
Living people
American children's writers
Bryn Mawr College alumni
Sanford School of Public Policy alumni
Women nonprofit executives
People from Rajasthan
North Carolina School of Science and Mathematics alumni
Henry Crown Fellows
Indian American